is a Japanese politician of the Liberal Democratic Party, a member of the House of Councillors in the Diet (national legislature). A native of Niigata Prefecture, he attended Kyoto University and received a master's degree in engineering from it. After working at the Ministry of Land, Infrastructure and Transport, He was elected to the House of Councillors for the first time in 2007.

References

External links 
 Official website in Japanese.

Members of the House of Councillors (Japan)
Living people
1947 births
Liberal Democratic Party (Japan) politicians